Good on Paper is a 2021 American romantic comedy film, directed by Kimmy Gatewood in her directorial debut, from a screenplay by Iliza Shlesinger. It stars Shlesinger, Ryan Hansen, Margaret Cho, and Rebecca Rittenhouse. The film was released on June 23, 2021, by Netflix.

Plot
Andrea Singer is a stand-up comedian and a struggling aspiring actress. At the airport on the way home from an audition, Andrea meets Dennis Kelley when he returns her missing boarding pass.

On the flight, Andrea finds herself sitting next to Dennis, who tells her that he’s a Yale graduate who works in hedge funds. They hit it off and begin hanging out together in Los Angeles. Dennis helps Andrea prepare for auditions and they become good friends. Dennis grows attached to Andrea and asks her for a relationship, but she rejects him. One night, Dennis gets Andrea to spend time with him under false pretenses. They get high and go out, hooking up at the end of the night. In the morning, Andrea agrees to be his girlfriend.

As Andrea and Dennis get closer, she and her friend Margot start to question if he is all that he claims. Andrea learns Dennis has lied about his house, his sick mother, his job, and his college education. In an attempt to get even, Margot gets Dennis drunk and he passes out. Margot and Andrea accidentally injure Dennis, and Andrea confronts him for his lying. Andrea later learns that Dennis has taken her to court for kidnapping him. After confronting him again, she is given a restraining order and more fodder for her stand-up routine.

Cast
 Iliza Shlesinger as Andrea Singer, a stand-up comedian who has been putting her career ahead of romance
 Ryan Hansen as Dennis Kelley, Andrea's love interest. He claims to be a Yale graduate and a hedge fund manager, but nothing is really what it seems
 Margaret Cho as Margot, Andrea's best friend who owns a bar. She is suspicious of Dennis's story.
 Rebecca Rittenhouse as Serrena Halstead, a rival actress who seems to audition for a lot of parts that Andrea is going for, and lands them.  
 Matt McGorry as Brett, Andrea's cousin, and an actual Yale graduate
 Tyler Cameron as Ruggedly Handsome Man
 Taylor Hill as Chanterelle
 Kimia Behpoornia as Maggie, Dennis's roommate
 Beth Dover as Leslie
 Sonya Eddy as Judge Harriet Gold

Origin
The film originated from a real-life incident involving Shlesinger, which she turned into a stand-up routine called "Lying Brian" in 2015 that was broadcast on This Is Not Happening on Comedy Central. In Shlesinger's comedic routine, she tells of meeting a man named Brian Murphy on an airplane. Brian claimed to be a Yale graduate and worked at a hedge fund. They became friends, but when he called to tell her that his mother had cancer, they dated more and got into a relationship. Shlesinger's mother was suspicious of his background, finding that he went to Ohio State University and that he lived in a duplex in Hollywood and not a house in Beverly Hills. When Shlesinger asked Brian for his mother's address, she found that no one related lived there. Brian eventually confessed it was all a lie to try to impress her.

Production

In April 2020, it was reported that Iliza Shlesinger had completed the film in a lead role, with Kimmy Gatewood directing, with Universal Pictures distributing.

Principal photography began in November 2019 and completed in December 2019.

Release
The film was released on June 23, 2021, by Netflix.

Reception

On review aggregator Rotten Tomatoes, the film holds an approval rating of 51% based on 37 reviews, with the average rating of 5.1/10. The website's critical consensus reads, "Writer-star Iliza Shlesinger finds some laughs in real-life romantic travails, but Good on Paper makes an overall awkward transition from stand-up to screen." On Metacritic, the film holds a rating of 54 out of 100, based on 11 critics, indicating "mixed or average reviews".

Decider called it an anti-rom-com and wrote: "A solid premise and Shlesinger and Hansen's unconventional chemistry make it more than worth your while."

References

External links
 
 
 

American romantic comedy films
Universal Pictures films
English-language Netflix original films
2021 directorial debut films
2020s English-language films
2020s American films